MP Promotions, is a Philippine boxing promotion based in General Santos, Philippines.

History
The company was established in 2015 by eight-division world champion Manny Pacquiao. Sean Gibbons was named president the promotion and the official match maker. The promotions aims to help young aspiring boxers especially in the Philippines.

Currently the biggest boxing promotion on the Philippines following the unexpected closure of the fabled ALA Boxing a Cebu-based boxing stable after 35 years owing to the effects of the COVID-19 pandemic and the closure of longtime TV partner ABS-CBN. MP Promotion is in partnership with US-based TGB Promotions.

Notable Boxers

Retired Boxers

References

Sports event promotion companies
Entertainment companies established in 2015
Manny Pacquiao